Descanso (Spanish for "Rest"; Kumeyaay: Wataay) is a small unincorporated community in the Cuyamaca Mountains, within the Mountain Empire area of southeastern San Diego County, California. The community's name is a Spanish word meaning "rest from labor". 

The population was 1,423 at the 2010 census. For statistical purposes, the United States Census Bureau as designated Descanso as a census-designated place. It is in California's 50th congressional district.

Descanso is located east of Alpine and west of Pine Valley. At a  elevation, it is located at the south entrance to Cuyamaca Rancho State Park and also borders Cleveland National Forest to the west and east.

The area was heavily threatened by the 2003 Cedar Fire. The community consists of many small ranches and newer homes of San Diego commuters. Horseback riding and hiking are frequent pastimes due to the proximity to San Diego's back-country recreation areas. It is approximately a 50-minute commute from downtown San Diego. The majority of residents generally commute to San Diego as the local job market is limited. Community radio station KNSJ operates out of Descanso.

The Descanso Fire Station of the United States Forest Service is home to the Laguna Hotshots.  Descanso is home to many firefighters, and many local teenagers join either the Forest Service or the California Department of Forestry and Fire Protection (which also provides direct fire and EMS protection to the community).

The ZIP Code is 91916 and the community is inside area code 619.

Geography

According to the United States Census Bureau, the CDP covers an area of 19.2 square miles (49.8 km2), all of it land.

Climate
According to the Köppen Climate Classification system, Descanso has a warm-summer Mediterranean climate, abbreviated "Csa" on climate maps.

Demographics

The 2010 United States Census reported that Descanso had a population of 1,423. The racial makeup of Descanso was 1,290 (90.7%) White, 5 (0.4%) African American, 29 (2.0%) Native American, 16 (1.1%) Asian, 9 (0.6%) Pacific Islander, 46 (3.2%) from other races, and 28 (2.0%) from two or more races. Hispanic or Latino of any race were 150 persons (10.5%).

The Census reported that 1,423 people (100% of the population) lived in households, 0 (0%) lived in non-institutionalized group quarters, and 0 (0%) were institutionalized.

There were 585 households, out of which 152 (26.0%) had children under the age of 18 living in them, 326 (55.7%) were opposite-sex married couples living together, 44 (7.5%) had a female householder with no husband present, 27 (4.6%) had a male householder with no wife present.  There were 33 (5.6%) unmarried opposite-sex partnerships, and 7 (1.2%) same-sex married couples or partnerships. 140 households (23.9%) were made up of individuals, and 54 (9.2%) had someone living alone who was 65 years of age or older. The average household size was 2.43.  There were 397 families (67.9% of all households); the average family size was 2.82.

The population was spread out, with 256 people (18.0%) under the age of 18, 108 people (7.6%) aged 18 to 24, 260 people (18.3%) aged 25 to 44, 604 people (42.4%) aged 45 to 64, and 195 people (13.7%) who were 65 years of age or older.  The median age was 49.0 years. For every 100 females, there were 101.8 males.  For every 100 females age 18 and over, there were 103.0 males.

The homeowner vacancy rate was 3.3%; the rental vacancy rate was 9.4%.  1,086 people (76.3% of the population) lived in owner-occupied housing units and 337 people (23.7%) lived in rental housing units.

Local attractions
Local attractions include:
 Laguna Mountains
 Viejas Casino
 Lake Cuyamaca
 Lake Morena
 Pacific Southwest Railway Museum
 Julian, nearby historical mining town
 Sweetwater River

Local churches
 Chapel of the Hills Methodist Church
 Our Lady of Light Catholic Church

References

Census-designated places in San Diego County, California
Cuyamaca Mountains
Mountain Empire (San Diego County)
Census-designated places in California